Events in the year 2018 in Liberia.

Incumbents
 President: Ellen Johnson Sirleaf (until 22 January); George Weah, taking over from 22 January.
 Vice President: Joseph Boakai (until 22 January); Jewel Taylor, taking over from 22 January.
 Chief Justice: Francis S. Korkpor, Sr.

Events

 January 22 – George Weah takes the oath of office, having won the second round of the presidential election in December.
 March 30 – The mandate of the United Nations Mission in Liberia ends.
 July 26 – Minister of Finance and Development Planning Samuel Tweah serves as national Independence Day orator.

Deaths

References

 
2010s in Liberia
Years of the 21st century in Liberia
Liberia
Liberia